Barskoye-Syrishchevo is a rural locality (a village) in Komyanskoye Rural Settlement, Gryazovetsky District, Vologda Oblast, Russia. The population was 6 as of 2002.

Geography 
Barskoye-Syrishchevo is located 39 km northeast of Gryazovets (the district's administrative centre) by road. Volnoye-Syrishchevo is the nearest locality. lake Maurinskoye nearest lake  with 4 village Maurino and mount Maura in region connecting with a line form a bracket

References 

Rural localities in Gryazovetsky District